Triplonchida is an order of terrestrial nematodes, and is one of two orders making up the subclass Enoplia.

Taxonomy 
There are three suborders:
Diphtherophorina
Tobrilina
Tripylina

References

Bibliography 

De Ley, P & Blaxter, M 2004, 'A new system for Nematoda: combining morphological characters with molecular trees, and translating clades into ranks and taxa'. in R Cook & DJ Hunt (eds), Nematology Monographs and Perspectives. vol. 2, E.J. Brill, Leiden, pp. 633–653.

Enoplia
Nematode orders